Christophe Guelpa (born 25 June 1963) is a French former sport shooter who competed in the 1988 Summer Olympics.

References

1963 births
Living people
French male sport shooters
Trap and double trap shooters
Olympic shooters of France
Shooters at the 1988 Summer Olympics
20th-century French people